MBC Masr is an Egyptian free-to-air television channel owned by MBC Group.

The channel was launched during an official ceremony in Cairo on 16 October 2012, and began broadcasting on 9 November 2012. The channel serves Egyptian viewers.

Programming

Shows 
 Miss Farah

North American series 
 Blue Bloods
 Friends
 NCIS
 NCIS: Los Angeles

British series 
 Atlantis

Mexican drama 
 En tierras salvajes
 La reina soy yo

Spanish drama 
 La bella y las bestias
 La Piloto
 Velvet

Portuguese drama 
 Paixão
 Rainha das Flores
 Terra Brava

Turkish drama 
 Umutsuz Ev Kadınları

Brazilian drama 
 Além do Tempo
 Deus Salve o Rei
 Justiça
 Rock Story
 Sol Nascente
 Totalmente Demais
 Verdades Secretas

Greek drama 
 To Tatouaz

Wrestling 
 WWE Crown Jewel
 WWE RAW

Films

North American films 
 2 Fast 2 Furious
 211
 Allied
 Baywatch
 Beauty and the Beast
 Bedtime Stories
 Captain Phillips
 Collateral Beauty
 Contagion
 Fast & Furious
 Fast & Furious 6
 Fast Five
 The Fast and the Furious
 The Fast and the Furious: Tokyo Drift
 The Fate of the Furious
 First Blood
 Furious 7
 Hercules
 Jack Reacher
 Jack Reacher: Never Go Back
 Jackie
 Paul
 Rambo
 Rambo: First Blood Part II
 Rambo III
 Rambo: Last Blood
 Shall We Dance?
 Spinning Man
 Suicide Squad
 Teenage Mutant Ninja Turtles

Australian films 
 Mad Max: Fury Road

Hindi-language films 
 Bang Bang!
 Badrinath Ki Dulhania
 Befikre
 Dishoom
 Fan
 Humpty Sharma Ki Dulhania
 Laila Majnu
 Luka Chuppi
 Pink

Urdu-language films 
 Baaji

External links
 

2012 establishments in Egypt
Television channels and stations established in 2012
Television in Egypt
Television in the United Arab Emirates
Free-to-air
Arabic-language television stations
Middle East Broadcasting Center